Dixon Ryan Fox (December 7, 1887 – January 30, 1945) was an American educator, researcher, and president of Union College, New York from 1934 until his death in 1945.

Fox graduated from Columbia College in 1911.

He took his Ph.D in history at Columbia University where he was influenced by James Harvey Robinson, Charles A. Beard and Herbert L. Osgood. He married Osgood's daughter and taught at Columbia from 1912 to the mid-1930s.

His academic work focused on social history and American social, political and economic elite and power structures, especially as they relate to immigration, ethnic conflict and national identity.

Fox's publications have been reprinted due to their prescient nature, including The Decline of Aristocracy in the Politics of New York (1919, repr. 1971); a biography of Herbert L. Osgood (his father-in-law); and Yankees and Yorkers (1940, 1989). With Arthur M. Schlesinger, Sr., he was co-editor of the series A History of American Life.

Notes

Further reading

1887 births
1945 deaths
Columbia University faculty
20th-century American historians
American male non-fiction writers
Presidents of Union College (New York)
Columbia College (New York) alumni
20th-century American male writers
Burials at Sleepy Hollow Cemetery
20th-century American academics